The Communauté d'agglomération Saint Germain Boucles de Seine is the communauté d'agglomération, an intercommunal structure, in the western suburbs of Paris. It is located in the Yvelines and Val-d'Oise departments, in the Île-de-France region, northern France. It was created in January 2016. Its seat is in Le Pecq. Its area is 666.7 km2. Its population was 335,109 in 2018.

Composition
The communauté d'agglomération consists of the following 19 communes, of which one (Bezons) in the Val-d'Oise department:

Aigremont
Bezons
Carrières-sur-Seine
Chambourcy
Chatou
Croissy-sur-Seine
L'Étang-la-Ville
Houilles
Louveciennes
Maisons-Laffitte
Mareil-Marly
Marly-le-Roi
Le Mesnil-le-Roi
Montesson
Le Pecq
Le Port-Marly
Saint-Germain-en-Laye
Sartrouville
Le Vésinet

References

Saint Germain
Saint Germain
Saint Germain